Michael Kenyon is a Canadian writer from British Columbia, who won the ReLit Award for fiction in 2010 for his novel The Beautiful Children. He was also a ReLit poetry nominee in the same year for The Last House.

His debut novel, Kleinberg, was a shortlisted finalist for the Books in Canada First Novel Award in 1992, and for the Commonwealth Writers Prize for Best First Book, Canada/Caribbean.

His other books have included the novels The Biggest Animals and A Year at River Mountain, and the short story collection Parallel Rivers.

References

20th-century Canadian novelists
20th-century Canadian poets
20th-century Canadian male writers
20th-century Canadian short story writers
21st-century Canadian novelists
21st-century Canadian poets
21st-century Canadian short story writers
Canadian male novelists
Canadian male poets
Canadian male short story writers
Writers from British Columbia
Living people
21st-century Canadian male writers
Year of birth missing (living people)